A war horse is a horse used for fighting, including light and heavy cavalry, reconnaissance, logistical support, or in individual combat.

War Horse or Warhorse may also refer to:
War Horse (novel), a children's novel by Michael Morpurgo
War Horse (play), a stage adaptation of the book
War Horse (film), a film based upon the book, directed by Steven Spielberg
The War Horse, a 1927 American film by Lambert Hillyer
Warhorse (British band), a British hard rock band
Warhorse (American band), an American heavy metal band
Warhorse , an album released in 2012 by the Dutch band Picture
War Horse (American football) or Bob Hill (1891–19??), professional football player
HMH-465 or Warhorse, a USMC helicopter squadron
Warhorse, a novel by Timothy Zahn
Warhorse Studios, a Czech video game company
Warhorse, a veteran soldier
Warhorse (wrestler), American professional wrestler

See also
Courser (horse), a fast medieval horse ridden by knights and men-at-arms .
Destrier, a medieval horse ridden by knights in battle and tournaments
James Longstreet or "Old War Horse"
Horses in the Middle Ages
Horses in East Asian warfare
History of the horse in South Asia
Horses in the Napoleonic Wars
Horses in World War I
Horses in World War II
History of the horse in Britain
Horse artillery